The 2004–05 FA Women's Premier League Cup was the 14th edition of the FA Women's Premier League's league cup competition, which began in 1991. It was sponsored by Nationwide and was officially known as the FA Nationwide Women's Premier League Cup. The competition was contested by all 34 teams of the three divisions of the FA Women's Premier League (National Division, Northern Division and Southern Division). Arsenal won their eight title after a 3–0 win over Charlton Athletic in the final.

Results
All results listed are published by The Football Association (FA).
The division each team play in is indicated in brackets after their name: (NA)=National Division; (NO)=Northern Division; (S)=Southern Division.

Preliminary round

First round

Second round

Quarter-finals

Semi-finals

Final

See also
 2004–05 FA Women's Premier League
 2005 FA Women's Cup Final

References

External links
 RSSSF

FA Women's National League Cup